Two submarines of Germany have borne the name UA:

 , a  launched in May 1914 as HNoMS A-5 and seized by Germany in August 1914. She was surrendered at the end of World War I and sold for scrap but sank en route to the breakers.
  an  launched in 1938 as TCG Batiray she was seized and renamed UA by Germany in 1939. She was scuttled in 1945

See also
 German Type UA submarine

German Navy ship names